Yevla (or Yeola) Assembly constituency is one of the fifteen constituencies of the Maharashtra Vidhan Sabha located in the Nashik district.

Overview
It (Yeola / Yevla / येवला) is a part of the Dindori (Lok Sabha constituency), along with five other assembly constituencies, viz Chandwad Assembly constituency, Dindori, Kalvan, Nandgaon Assembly constituency and Niphad Assembly constituency .

Members of Vidhan Sabha
 1990: Marutirao Narayan Pawar, Indian National Congress
 1995: Kalyanrao Jayvantrao Patil, Shiv Sena
 1999: Kalyanrao Jayvantrao Patil, Shiv Sena
 2004: Chhagan Bhujbal, Nationalist Congress Party
 2009: Chhagan Bhujbal, Nationalist Congress Party
 2014: Chhagan Bhujbal, Nationalist Congress Party
 2019: Chhagan Bhujbal, Nationalist Congress Party

Election results

Assembly Elections 2004

Assembly Elections 2009

Assembly Elections 2014

Assembly Election 2019

See also
 Nandgaon (disambiguation)
 List of constituencies of Maharashtra Vidhan Sabha

References

Assembly constituencies of Maharashtra